The Peugeot Rapido is a 49 cc scooter built by Peugeot.

See also
 List of scooters
 List of scooter manufacturers

Motor scooters
Rapido